Courtaulds was a United Kingdom-based manufacturer of fabric, clothing, artificial fibres, and chemicals. It was established in 1794 and became the world's leading man-made fibre production company before being broken up in 1990 into Courtaulds plc and Courtaulds Textiles Ltd.

History

Foundation
The company was founded by George Courtauld and his cousin Peter Taylor (1790–1850) in 1794 as a silk, crepe and textile business at Pebmarsh in north Essex trading as George Courtauld & Co. In 1810, his American-born son Samuel Courtauld was managing his own silk mill in Braintree, Essex.

In 1818, George Courtauld returned to America, leaving Samuel Courtauld and Taylor to expand the business, now known as Courtauld & Taylor, by building further mills in Halstead and Bocking. In 1825 Courtauld installed a steam engine at the Bocking mill, and then installed power looms at Halstead. His mills, however, remained heavily dependent on young female workers – in 1838, over 92% of his workforce was female.

By 1850, Courtauld employed over 2,000 people in his three silk mills, and he had recruited partners including (in 1828) his brother, George Courtauld II (1802–1861) and (in 1849) fellow Unitarian social reformer Peter Alfred Taylor (1819-1891 – son of Peter Taylor who died the following year). By this time, Courtauld was a wealthy man but was also suffering from deafness. He had planned to spend more time on his country estate Gosfield Hall near Halstead, but continued to play an active role in the company until just before he died in March 1881.

His great-nephew Samuel Courtauld (1876–1947) became chairman of the Courtauld company in 1921 but is chiefly remembered today as the founder of the Courtauld Institute of Art in London. William Julien Courtauld was also a benefactor of the arts: he gave artworks to the Essex County Council chamber at Chelmsford and the town hall at Braintree in the 1930s.

Expansion
Wishing to reduce their dependence on natural silk, in 1904 Courtaulds acquired the Cross and Bevan's patents to the viscose process for manufacturing artificial silk or rayon from dissolving pulp. They set up the first factory to produce it in Coventry UK in 1905. The early yarns were first woven into fabrics at the Halstead Mill in Essex in March 1906, but the process remained troublesome until further inventions improved yarn strength. However, in a few years the process became highly successful and was responsible for transforming the silk weaver into the world's leading man-made fibre production company. In the interwar era, Courtaulds, along with its domestic rival, British Celanese, both benefitted from tariff protection extended to the rayon industry by the Finance Act of 1925.

Courtaulds also entered the market of cellulosics (viscose and acetate) in North America with the setting up of the American Viscose Corporation (AVC) in 1909. The investment in the US was highly successful, but its sale at a knock-down price was enforced in 1941 as part of the negotiations which preceded Lend-Lease. Courtaulds was Canada's only rayon manufacturer in the 1980s, and was criticized for polluting Cornwall, Ontario. By 1989 the company was dumping "an average of 12 million litres of water a day, loaded with acids, zinc, murky solid materials and other contaminants.... Tests in 1986 showed the company's waste killed healthy trout within five minutes."

In 1927–28 Courtaulds and Vereinigte Glanzstoff-Fabriken (VGF) gained control of the Italian rayon manufacturer SNIA Viscosa from Riccardo Gualino. A German director of VGF, Karl Scherer, replaced Gualino as head of the firm and cut output drastically. The foreign intervention was seen as humiliating by the fascists. In Europe Courtaulds expanded its cellulosics business both directly and in joint ventures, including British Cellophane.

In 1945 Courtaulds remained one of the four groups which dominated the man-made fibre industry in Europe (counting the German VGF and the Dutch AKU as one group, and including also the CTA—later merged into Rhone Poulenc in France, and Snia Viscose in Italy). Courtaulds' activities in continental Europe consisted in a wholly owned, one-factory viscose fibre business employing some 3,000 people in France, a 50% share in a similar business in Germany (of which the other 50% was owned by VGF, the major competitor), and a minority shareholding which controlled 20% of the voting capital in the Italian firm Snia Viscosa, also primarily a viscose fibre producer. This activity expanded until the 1960s, when these products were replaced by newer developments.

In 1964 Courtaulds acquired Fine Spinners and Doublers for £14 million and the Lancashire Cotton Corporation for £22 million.

Post World War II
Carbon disulfide, used in rayon production, increases the risk of heart attacks and strokes in rayon workers (among other health risks, some of them known since the 1800s). Data on these additional risks came out in the 1960s. Courtaulds worked hard to prevent publication of this data in the UK.

Courtaulds was one of the earliest companies in the UK to establish an economics department. In the three decades following World War II that department made notable contributions to the understanding of investment appraisal and the formulation of British, and later European, trade policy. The function also played a significant role in the development of Courtaulds from a rather sedate, man-made fibres producer to the world's largest textile manufacturer, a position the company attained in the mid-1970s. The economics department then influenced the early stages of the subsequent extensive restructuring of the company, a process that culminated in the demerging of its textile activities as a separately quoted company in March 1990.

In 1962 a hostile takeover attempt by Imperial Chemical Industries was defeated.

In the 1980s, Courtaulds bought a patent license on lyocell technology from Akzo. The lyocell process does not use carbon disulfide.

Break-up
By the late 1980s, the manufacture of clothing was quickly moving to South East Asia and China. Courtaulds had closed many of its UK factories and moved production to new Asian sites. Further, its main profit was coming from its fibre and chemicals businesses, which were being held back by the textiles business.

In 1990, Courtaulds plc demerged itself into two parts:
 Courtaulds plc – The fibre manufacture and chemicals businesses.
 Courtaulds Textiles Ltd – The yarn and fabric manufacture and clothing businesses.

Courtaulds plc
The global chemicals industry was in a distinct recession, and the company faced difficult times.

In 1990, the company began pilot production of Tencel, a brand of lyocell rayon. The production of lyocell does not use carbon disulfide, but is more expensive than viscose rayon. In January 1993, the Tencel plant in Mobile, Alabama, US reached full production levels of 20,000 tons per year, by which time Courtaulds had spent £100 million and 10 years on Tencel development. Tencel revenues for 1993 were estimated as likely to be £50 million.

In 1991, the company closed a viscose plant in Calais, France, allowing its other plants to boost output to 93% capacity, compared with an industry average of 75%. The share price doubled in the first three years following the demerger. CEO Sipko Huismans had focused the company on rationalisation and cost cutting, saying "We have to cut costs. We can't count on sales growth to pay us more or to allow us to buy more of our favorite things."

In 1993 the company employed 23,000 and had £2 billion in annual revenue, with 30% of revenue from the United States, 40% from Europe and 15% from Asia-Pacific.

Seeking to expand its business, specifically in Asia-Pacific, Courtaulds plc delivered part of its development in joint ventures, particularly with Akzo Nobel. It sought to merge with Akzo-Nobel, which the EU approved subject to the sale of Courtauld's aerospace business. In 1998 it merged with competitor Akzo Nobel. The name "Courtaulds" disappeared.

Akzo Nobel combined the Tencel division with other fibre divisions under the Accordis banner, then sold them off to private equity (CVC Partners). In 2000, CVC sold the Tencel division to Lenzing AG, who combined it with their "Lenzing Lyocell" business, but maintained the brand name Tencel. At this time "Tencel" production was at 80,000 tonnes/year.

In September 2000, Courtaulds Fibers Inc. was found guilty of negligence for polluting the environment outside its plant in Axis, Alabama, US with carbon disulfide. 1991 emissions were more than double those of the nine other plants in Alabama combined, and made minimal improvements to abide by the 1990 amendments to the United States' Clean Air Act. In Europe, Courtaulds had taken much more stringent emissions-reduction measures.

Courtaulds Aerospace
In October 2000, PPG Industries announced it had agreed to buy Courtaulds Aerospace for $US512.5 million. Based in Glendale, California, US the aerospace business has annual sales of approximately $US240 million, employs 1,200 people. In the US it manufactures sealants in Glendale, California, US and Shildon, England; coatings and sealants in Mojave, California, US; glazing sealants at Gloucester City, New Jersey, US; and also coatings at Gonfreville, France. The business also operates 14 application-support centres in North America, Europe, Africa, Asia and Australia.

Courtaulds Textiles
After its demerger, Courtaulds Textiles sold off its retail businesses; the Contessa lingerie chain and McIlroys had been sold by 1995.

In 2000, the American-based Sara Lee acquired Courtaulds Textiles in a hostile takeover for £150million. "Courtaulds Textile" remained as a division of Sara Lee, unlike the chemical merger, which saw "Courtaulds" disappear into Akzo Nobel.

In the early 2000s, many jobs and factories were eliminated, especially in the UK, where manufacturing costs were higher. Marks and Spencer was squeezing its suppliers for lower costs. In 2007, 40% of Courtauld's turnover was from sales to Marks & Spencer (though sales had declined rapidly, as of 2006).

In February 2005, Brenda C. Barnes became the chairman and CEO of Sara Lee, and tried to sell the Courtaulds Textile division.

In April 2006, the UK pension regulator required Sara Lee to increase payments into Courtaulds' $483 million (£260 million) pension deficit from £20m to £32m a year until 2015. In May 2006, Sara Lee sold Courtaulds Textiles (but not its pension debt) for an undisclosed sum. It was bought by a consortium lead by PD Enterprise Limited, a private company based in Hong Kong. At the time, Courtaulds had about a thousand employees in the UK, of whom 300 were employed at a tights factory. Times Brenda Barnes commented that Sara Lee had effectively "given away" the unit.

In 2007, Courtaulds Textiles employed around 20,000 people across 16 countries in Europe, North America and Asia. It had moved most of its manufacturing jobs offshore, most of which was divested in joint ventures for flexibility. One of these joint venture was Slimline (Pvt) Ltd, Sri Lanka's largest apparel manufacturer, employing 1450 people and with a turnover of 25 million British pounds, and  Courtaulds Clothing Lanka, which employed 700 people to make men's underwear. The whole company had an annual turnover exceeding £1billion.

PD Enterprise Ltd., a privately held company based in Hong Kong, operates nine facilities that produce more than 120 million garments annually.  Its products include lingerie, underwear, nightwear, swim and beachwear, formalwear and casualwear, jackets and coats, babywear and socks.

Brands
 Berlei – Lingerie and Activewear
 Gossard – Lingerie
 Aristoc – Hosiery
 Pretty Polly – Hosiery, Lingerie and Activewear
 Elbeo – Hosiery

Production sites
 Flintshire – A subsidiary of a German company, the British Glanzstoff Manufacturing Company started an artificial silk factory in Flint in 1907. During World War I the factory closed down but was taken over by Courtaulds in 1917. In 1913, the company had started making the synthetic fibre viscose rayon, made from cellulose derived from imported wood pulp or cotton waste. Courtaulds in September 1919 bought the old Muspratt Alkali factory in Flint from United Alkali Co Ltd and called it Castle Works, where after conversion they started production in 1922 of manufactured viscose rayon yarn. Courtaulds also in December 1927 bought the Holywell Textile Mill in Flint which they called Deeside Mill and after reconstruction and alterations was used for yarn processing. At its height Courtaulds employed over 10,000 people at four sites. At Greenfield, some  further down the Dee estuary, two additional large rayon production facilities existed from 1936 onwards, named Number 1 and Number 2. These mills employed over 3,000 people. Textile production declined from 1950, and Aber works shut initially in 1957, opened for rayon in 1966, and pulled down in 1984. Castle works closed in 1977 and Deeside Mill in 1989. The number 1 facility at Greenfield was mothballed in 1978, and the entire site was decommissioned in the mid 1980s.
 Chorley, Lancashire – Talbot Mill on the eastern periphery of the town was built in 1908 and consisted of separate spinning and weaving divisions. The spinning division of the mill was managed by Courtaulds from the early 1970s and closed in 1989.
 Preston – A large rayon production facility, called the Red Scar mill, existed in Preston. The main product was tyrecord.  It employed around 4,000 people. It was decommissioned in 1980.
 Northern Ireland – A rayon facility existed in Carrickfergus, which was designed specifically to make a fibre suitable for the Irish linen industry. Many of the latterly held British-based jobs were based in the grant-aided infrastructure of Northern Ireland. Limavady employed 185 jobs, which were lost in May 2004.
 Wolverhampton – Dunstall Hall Works – Rayon facility.
 Coventry – Foleshill Road Works:
 Courtaulds Research – Developed Courtelle, Vincel, Evlan, Viloft, Galaxy, Kesp, synthetic tobacco, Tencel, lyocell, Hydrocel, Alginate.
 Courtaulds Grafil – Production of carbon fibre for use in sports, aerospace and automotive industries.
 National Plastics – Production of specialised plastic products including British military bulletproof helmets.
 Courtaulds Engineering – Design of plant, production of spinneretts.

 Derby – Spondon Works – Acetate fibre, water-soluble polymers.
 Grimsby – The Grimsby 'Fibro' plant was built on the bank of the Humber West of Grimsby between 1952 and 1957 to produce viscose rayon staple fibre, known as Fibro.  In 1959 a new 'Courtelle' factory was constructed to make a proprietary acrylic fibre.  Both factories were substantially expanded in the 1960s and 1970s. Later the advanced form of rayon known as Tencel fibre was manufactured using a more environmentally friendly process.  Acrylic dope for 'Grafil' carbon fibre was also manufactured.  The site was sold in 1998 to Accordis UK Ltd; the Tencel plant sold to the Lenzing Group, whilst the acrylic fibre plant went through a number of administrations in the 2000s, with production ceasing 2013.
 Trafford Park – Manufacture of carbon disulfide, base of Cowburn & Cowpar (chemical transport).
 Worksop – Formerly known as "Bairnswear", the 36,000 m2, 205.72 m × 175 m factory first opened its doors in 1953 as Bairnswear knitwear. The site was a relativity modern mid-20th century mill which was located on Raymoth Lane and it employed over 1000 employees (1950s–1970s). In the early 1960s it was rebranded as Courtaulds when Bairnswear hit financial difficulty. In 1989 Princess Diana visited the site, at the same time as she visited to open the new Bassetlaw Hospital. Rumours of the site's closure circulated throughout the 1980s and 1990s and this happened in 2000. A small factory shop stayed open for another year selling all its goods off cheaply. During the early 2000s after the mill had ceased production the factory was still in good condition and a buyer was sought. The site deteriorated for three years until Westbury Homes bought it for residential redevelopment in July 2003. In spite of local objections including the MP John Mann to keep the 9-acre site to form another industry, planning permission was granted, asbestos was stripped and the factory demolished in September 2003 – January 2004, and the site has since been redeveloped into residential housing.
 Middlesbrough – Started as factory then moved solely to warehousing and distribution closed July 2010.
 Somerset (Bridgwater) British Cellophane was set up in the early 20th century to produce Cellophane, a cellulose based clear packaging.  Production finally ceased in the early 1990s and the site is now to be used for housing for a new power station.
  Courtaulds and its many subsidiaries had many other production sites not listed above.

References

Further reading
 D. C. Coleman: Courtaulds: an economic and social history (Clarendon)
 Vol 1: The nineteenth century: silk and crape (1969)
 Vol 2: Rayon (1969)
 Vol 3: Crisis and change, 1940-1965 (1980)
 Bramwell G Rudd: Courtaulds and the Hosiery & Knitwear Industry. Carnegie Publishing Ltd, 2014,  (softback),  (hardback)

External links
 From Genesis to Exodus: The Development of Tencel in Courtaulds 1979-89 
 Courtaulds background
 Courtaulds in Europe
 Catalogue of the Courtaulds' Senior Staff Association archives, held at the Modern Records Centre, University of Warwick
 Catalogue of the Courtaulds' Group One Staff Association archives, held at the Modern Records Centre, University of Warwick
 

Textile manufacturers of England
Textile companies of the United Kingdom
Defunct manufacturing companies of England
Chemical companies of the United Kingdom
Cotton industry in England
Former textile mills in the United Kingdom
Silk production
Companies based in Essex
British companies established in 1794
Manufacturing companies established in 1794
Manufacturing companies disestablished in 1990
1794 establishments in England
1990 disestablishments in England
Companies formerly listed on the London Stock Exchange